Still Point Zen Buddhist Temple is located at 4347 Trumbull in Detroit, Michigan. The community of Zen Buddhists welcomes people from all walks of life and faiths to Sunday meetings, retreats and workshops. The temple was founded by P'arang Geri Larkin. Her ordination on July 2, 1995, followed three years of Buddhist development at Maitreya Buddhist Seminary. She served as dharma teacher at the Zen Buddhist Temple in Ann Arbor, Michigan before founding Still Point Buddhist Temple. She was taught by Venerable Samu Sunim, a Korean Zen Master who has established several Buddhist temples in North America. Still Point Buddhist Temple traces its lineage to Korean Buddhism.  The current guiding teacher of Still Point Zen Buddhist Temple is Koho Vince Anila.  Koho is the 1st dharma successor of P'arang Geri Larkin, and was ordained in May 2003.

See also
 
Timeline of Zen Buddhism in the United States

External links
  Still Point Buddhist Temple Website

Asian-American culture in Metro Detroit
Buddhism in Michigan
Zen centers in the United States
Buddhist temples in Michigan
Religious buildings and structures in Detroit